Irati is a municipality in the state of Paraná in Brazil, with an estimated population 61,088 as of 2020.

Irati sprang up in the 1890s as a railroad town along the São Paulo–Rio Grande do Sul railroad line. The name, Irati, comes from the Tupi language and reportedly means "river of honey"  (apparently there were many bees in the region).

A distinguishing feature of many small towns in southern Brazil is the municipal anthem.

Notable people

 Denise Stoklos - Actress and playwright.
 Maíra Ribas - Businesswoman and photographer.
 Eliana Michaelichen Bezerra - TV hostess, actress and singer.

References

External links
Irati's anthem